Rangkhao Wor.Sangprapai is a Muay Thai fighter.

Titles and accomplishments
Professional Boxing Association of Thailand (PAT) 
 2016 Thailand 126 lbs Champion (1 defense)
True4U 
 2016 True4u 126 lbs Champion (1 defense)
 2017 CP-Meiji Tournament Winner
Rajadamnern Stadium 
 2019 Rajadamnern Stadium 130 lbs Champion

Fight record

|-  style="background:#fbb"
| 2022-12-28 || Loss ||align=left| Chujaroen Dabransarakarm || Muay Thai Rakya Soosakon + SAT Super Fight Withee Tin Thai + Petchyindee  || Bangkok, Thailand || Decision || 5 ||3:00

|-  style="background:#cfc;"
| 2022-11-18 || Win ||align=left| Hercules Phetsimean || Ruamponkon + Prachin || Prachinburi province, Thailand || KO (Elbows) ||2 || 

|-  style="text-align:center; background:#cfc;"
| 2022-08-19 || Win ||align=left| Sajjad Zubaidi || Rajadamnern World Series || Bangkok, Thailand || Decision || 3 ||3:00

|-  style="background:#cfc;"
| 2022-05-13|| Win ||align=left| Thaksinlek D.N.Muaythai || Muaymanwansuk, Rangsit Stadium || Rangsit, Thailand || KO (Elbow) || 3 || 
|-  style="background:#c5d2ea;"
| 2022-03-27|| Draw||align=left| Thaksinlek D.N.Muaythai || MAX Muay Thai|| Pattaya, Thailand || Decision || 3 || 3:00
|-  style="background:#fbb;"
| 2021-12-30|| Loss ||align=left| Thaksinlek D.N.Muaythai || Petchyindee, Rangsit Stadium|| Rangsit, Thailand || Decision || 5 ||3:00 
|-
! style=background:white colspan=9 |
|-  style="background:#cfc;"
| 2021-11-26|| Win ||align=left| Kaonar P.K. Saenchai Muaythaigym || Muaymanwansuk, Rangsit Stadium || Rangsit, Thailand || Decision || 5 || 3:00 
|-  style="background:#fbb"
| 2021-10-22|| Loss ||align=left| Thaksinlek D.N.Muaythai || Muaymanwansuk || Buriram province, Thailand || Decision || 5 || 3:00 
|-  style="background:#fbb"
| 2021-03-13 || Loss ||align=left| Superball Tded99|| Majujaya Muay Thai, Temporary Outdoors Stadium || Pattani, Thailand || KO (left hook) || 4||
|-  style="background:#cfc;"
| 2020-11-27 || Win ||align=left| Dechsakda SorJor.TongPrachin || Muaymanwansuk, Rangsit Stadium || Pathum Thani, Thailand || KO (knee to the head) ||4 ||
|-  style="background:#cfc;"
| 2020-10-23 || Win ||align=left| Samingdet Nor.Anuwatgym || Muaymanwansuk, Rangsit Stadium || Pathum Thani, Thailand || Decision ||5 || 3:00
|-  style="background:#cfc;"
| 2020-01-22|| Win||align=left| Panpayak Sitchefboontham || Rajadamnern Stadium || Bangkok, Thailand || Decision || 5 || 3:00
|-  style="background:#fbb;"
| 2019-10-10|| Loss ||align=left| Phet Utong Or. Kwanmuang || Rajadamnern Stadium || Bangkok, Thailand || Decision || 5 || 3:00
|-  style="background:#fbb;"
| 2019-08-08|| Loss||align=left| Superlek Kiatmuu9 || Rajadamnern Stadium || Bangkok, Thailand || Decision || 5 || 3:00
|-  style="background:#cfc;"
| 2019-07-11|| Win ||align=left| Superlek Kiatmuu9 || Rajadamnern Stadium || Bangkok, Thailand || Decision || 5 || 3:00 
|-
! style=background:white colspan=9 |
|-  style="background:#cfc;"
| 2019-05-24|| Win ||align=left|  Dennapoh Sor.Thanyalak  || Lumpinee Stadium  || Bangkok, Thailand|| KO (Left Knee to the body) || 3||
|-  style="background:#cfc;"
| 2019-01-17|| Win ||align=left|  Extra Sitworaphat  || Rajadamnern Stadium  || Bangkok, Thailand|| Decision|| 5 || 3:00
|-  style="background:#fbb;"
| 2018-10-10|| Loss||align=left| Detsakda Phukongyatsuepudomsuk  || Rajadamnern Stadium  || Bangkok, Thailand || Decision || 5 || 3:00
|-  style="background:#fbb;"
| 2018-08-09|| Loss||align=left| Rungkit Wor.Sanprapai  || Rajadamnern Stadium  || Bangkok, Thailand || Decision || 5 || 3:00
|-  style="background:#fbb;"
| 2018-07-05|| Loss ||align=left| Rungkit Wor.Sanprapai  || Rajadamnern Stadium  || Bangkok, Thailand || Decision || 5 || 3:00
|-  style="background:#cfc;"
| 2018-05-09|| Win ||align=left|  Petchsongphak SitJaroensap  || Rajadamnern Stadium  || Bangkok, Thailand|| KO || 4||
|-  style="background:#cfc;"
| 2018-04-09|| Win ||align=left|  Petchsongphak SitJaroensap  || Rajadamnern Stadium  || Bangkok, Thailand|| Decision|| 5 || 3:00
|-  style="background:#cfc;"
| 2018-02-27 || Win||align=left| Elias Mahmoudi || Best Of Siam XII Lumpinee Stadium || Bangkok, Thailand || Decision|| 5 || 3:00
|-  style="background:#fbb;"
| 2017-12-27|| Loss ||align=left|  Yamin P.K.SaenchaiMuayThaiGym  || Rajadamnern Stadium  || Bangkok, Thailand|| KO (High Kick) ||2 ||
|-  style="background:#cfc;"
| 2017-11-24|| Win ||align=left|  Surachai Sor.Sommai  || Rajadamnern Stadium  || Bangkok, Thailand|| Decision|| 5 || 3:00
|-  style="background:#fbb;"
| 2017-09-04|| Loss ||align=left|  Detsakda Phukongyatsuepudomsuk  || Rajadamnern Stadium  || Bangkok, Thailand|| KO (Punches) || 3 ||
|-  style="background:#fbb;"
| 2017-07-10|| Loss ||align=left| Phetwason Or.Daokrajai   || Rajadamnern Stadium  || Bangkok, Thailand || Decision || 5 || 3:00
|-
! style=background:white colspan=9 |
|-  style="background:#cfc;"
| 2017-04-07|| Win ||align=left|  Klasuek Petjinda || Rangsit Stadium || Pathum Thani, Thailand || Decision || 5 || 3:00 
|-
! style=background:white colspan=9 |
|-  style="background:#cfc;"
| 2017-03-10|| Win ||align=left|  Detsakda Phukongyatsuepudomsuk  || Rangsit Stadium ||  Pathum Thani, Thailand || Decision || 5 || 3:00
|-  style="background:#cfc;"
| 2017-01-20|| Win ||align=left| Kundiew Payapkumpan  || Rangsit Stadium ||  Thailand || Decision || 5 || 3:00
|-
! style=background:white colspan=9 |
|-  style="background:#cfc;"
| 2016-12-16|| Win ||align=left|  Klasuek Petjinda || Rangsit Stadium || Pathum Thani, Thailand || Decision || 5 || 3:00
|-  style="background:#cfc;"
| 2016-11-18 || Win||align=left| Dennapoh Sor.Thanyalak || Rangsit Stadium ||Pathum Thani, Thailand || KO || 4 ||
|-  style="background:#c5d2ea;"
| 2016-10-06|| Draw||align=left| Kundiew Payapkumpan  || Rajadamnern Stadium  || Bangkok, Thailand || Decision || 5 || 3:00
|-  style="background:#fbb;"
| 2016-08-11|| Loss ||align=left|  Petnamngam Or.Kwanmuang  || Rajadamnern Stadium  || Bangkok, Thailand || Decision || 5 || 3:00
|-  style="background:#cfc;"
| 2016-06-10|| Win ||align=left|  Klasuek Petjinda || Lumpinee Stadium || Bangkok, Thailand || Decision || 5 || 3:00 
|-
! style=background:white colspan=9 |
|-  style="background:#fbb;"
| 2016-04-16|| Loss ||align=left| Phetsongkom Sitjaroensap  || Omnoi Boxing Stadium  ||  Thailand || Decision || 5 || 3:00
|-
! style=background:white colspan=9 |
|-  style="background:#cfc;"
| 2016-03-18 || Win||align=left| Tomas Sor.Chaijaroen || Lumpinee Stadium || Bangkok, Thailand || KO (Right Elbow)|| 2 ||  
|-
! style=background:white colspan=9 |
|-  style="background:#cfc;"
| 2016-02-26 || Win||align=left| Tomas Sor.Chaijaroen || Lumpinee Stadium || Bangkok, Thailand || Decision || 5 || 3:00
|-  style="background:#cfc;"
| 2016-01-22 || Win||align=left| Hunyont Sitjaroensup || Lumpinee Stadium || Bangkok, Thailand || KO || 3 ||
|-  style="background:#cfc;"
| 2015-12-25|| Win ||align=left| Classic Sitkunwason || Lumpinee Stadium  || Bangkok, Thailand || Decision || 5 || 3:00
|-  style="background:#cfc;"
| 2015-10-24 || Win||align=left| Kotchasan || Rajadamnern Stadium || Bangkok, Thailand || KO || 3 ||
|-  style="background:#fbb;"
| 2015-09-19|| Loss ||align=left| Supernay Teeded 99 || Lumpinee Stadium  || Bangkok, Thailand || Decision || 5 || 3:00
|-  style="background:#cfc;"
| 2015-08-15 || Win||align=left| Longern Dabrunsarakam || Rajadamnern Stadium || Bangkok, Thailand || KO || 2 ||
|-  style="background:#cfc;"
| 2015-05-25 || Win||align=left| Yimsiam Nakhonmuangdet || Rajadamnern Stadium || Bangkok, Thailand || KO || 4 ||
|-
| colspan=9 | Legend:

References

Rangkhao Wor.Sangprapai
Living people
Year of birth missing (living people)
Rangkhao Wor.Sangprapai